Joan Geraldine Bennett (February 27, 1910 – December 7, 1990) was an American stage, film, and television actress. She came from a show-business family, one of three acting sisters. Beginning her career on the stage, Bennett appeared in more than 70 films from the era of silent films, well into the sound era. She is best remembered for her film noir femme fatale roles in director Fritz Lang's films—including Man Hunt (1941), The Woman in the Window (1944) and Scarlet Street (1945)—and for her television role as matriarch Elizabeth Collins Stoddard (and ancestors Naomi Collins, Judith Collins, and Flora Collins PT) in the gothic 1960s soap opera Dark Shadows, for which she received an Emmy nomination in 1968.

Bennett's career had three distinct phases: first as a winsome blonde ingenue, then as a sensuous brunette femme fatale (with looks that movie magazines often compared to those of Hedy Lamarr), and finally as a warmhearted wife-and-mother figure.

In 1951, Bennett's screen career was marred by scandal after her third husband, film producer Walter Wanger, shot and injured her agent Jennings Lang. Wanger suspected that Lang and she were having an affair, a charge which Bennett adamantly denied. She married four times.

For her final film role, as Madame Blanc in Dario Argento's cult horror film Suspiria (1977), she received a Saturn Award nomination.

Early life

Joan Geraldine Bennett was born in the Palisade section of Fort Lee, New Jersey, on February 27, 1910, the youngest of three daughters of actor Richard Bennett and actress/literary agent Adrienne Morrison. Her elder sisters were actress Constance Bennett and actress/dancer Barbara Bennett, who was the first wife of singer Morton Downey and the mother of Morton Downey Jr.
Part of a famous theatrical family, Bennett's maternal grandfather was Jamaica-born Shakespearean actor Lewis Morrison, who embarked on a stage career in the late 1860s. He was of English, Spanish, Jewish, and African ancestry. On the side of her maternal grandmother, actress Rose Wood, the profession dated back to traveling minstrels in 18th-century England.

Bennett first appeared in a silent movie as a child with her parents and sisters in her father's drama The Valley of Decision (1916), which he adapted for the screen. She attended Miss Hopkins School for Girls in Manhattan, then St. Margaret's, a boarding school in Waterbury, Connecticut, and L'Hermitage, a finishing school in Versailles, France.

On September 15, 1926, 16-year-old Bennett married John M. Fox in London. They divorced in Los Angeles on July 30, 1928, based on charges of his alcoholism. They had one child, Adrienne Ralston Fox (born February 20, 1928), for whom Bennett fought successfully in court to rename Diana Bennett Markey, when the child was eight years old. Her name changed to Diana Bennett Wanger in 1944.

Career

Bennett's stage debut was at the age of 18, acting with her father in Jarnegan (1928), which ran on Broadway for 136 performances and for which she received good reviews. By the time she turned 20 she had become a movie star through such roles as Phyllis Benton in Bulldog Drummond starring Ronald Colman, which was her first important role, and Lady Clarissa Pevensey opposite George Arliss in Disraeli (both 1929).

She moved quickly from movie to movie throughout the 1930s. Bennett appeared as a blonde (her natural hair color) for several years. She starred in the role of Dolores Fenton in the United Artists musical Puttin' On The Ritz (1930) opposite Harry Richman and as Faith Mapple, his beloved, opposite John Barrymore in an early sound version of Moby Dick (1930) at Warner Brothers.

Under contract to Fox Film Corporation, she appeared in several movies. Receiving top billing, she played the role of Jane Miller opposite Spencer Tracy in She Wanted a Millionaire (1932). She was billed second, after Tracy, for her role as Helen Riley, a personable waitress who trades wisecracks, in Me and My Gal (1932).

On March 16, 1932, she married screenwriter/film producer Gene Markey in Los Angeles, but the couple divorced in Los Angeles on June 3, 1937. They had one child, Melinda Markey (born February 27, 1934, on Bennett's 24th birthday).

Bennett left Fox to play Amy, a pert sister competing with Katharine Hepburn's Jo in Little Women (1933), which was directed by George Cukor for RKO. This movie brought Bennett to the attention of independent film producer Walter Wanger, who signed her to a contract and began managing her career. She played the role of Sally MacGregor, a psychiatrist's young wife slipping into insanity, in Private Worlds (1935) with Joel McCrea. Bennett starred in the film Vogues of 1938 (1937), including the title sequence, in which she donned a diamond-and-platinum bracelet set with the Star of Burma ruby. Wanger and director Tay Garnett persuaded her to change her hair from blonde to brunette as part of the plot for her role as Kay Kerrigan in the scenic Trade Winds (1938) opposite Fredric March.

With her change in appearance, Bennett began an entirely new screen career as her persona evolved into that of a glamorous, seductive femme fatale. She played the role of Princess Maria Theresa in The Man in the Iron Mask (1939) opposite Louis Hayward, and the role of the Grand Duchess Zona of Lichtenburg in The Son of Monte Cristo (1940) opposite Hayward.

During the search for an actress to play Scarlett O'Hara in Gone with the Wind, Bennett was given a screen test and impressed producer David O. Selznick to such an extent that she was one of the final four actresses, along with Jean Arthur, Vivien Leigh and Paulette Goddard.

On January 12, 1940, Bennett and producer Walter Wanger were married in Phoenix, Arizona. They were divorced in September 1965 in Mexico. The couple had two children together, Stephanie Wanger (born June 26, 1943) and Shelley Wanger (born July 4, 1948). The following year, on March 13, 1949, Bennett became a grandmother at the age of 39.

Combined with her sultry eyes and husky voice, Bennett's new brunette look gave her an earthier, more arresting persona. She won praise for her performances as Brenda Bentley in The House Across the Bay (1940), also featuring George Raft, and as Carol Hoffman in the anti-Nazi drama The Man I Married, a film in which Francis Lederer also starred.

She then appeared in a sequence of highly regarded film noir thrillers directed by Fritz Lang, with whom she and Wanger formed their own production company. Bennett appeared in four movies under Lang's direction, including as Cockney  Jerry Stokes in Man Hunt (1941) opposite Walter Pidgeon, as mysterious model Alice Reed in The Woman in the Window (1944) with Edward G. Robinson, and as vulgar blackmailer Katharine "Kitty" March in Scarlet Street (1945), another film with Robinson.

Bennett was the shrewish, cuckolding wife, Margaret Macomber, in Zoltan Korda's The Macomber Affair (1947) opposite Gregory Peck, as the deceitful wife, Peggy, in Jean Renoir's The Woman on the Beach (also 1947) opposite Robert Ryan and Charles Bickford, and as tormented Lucia Harper in Max Ophüls' The Reckless Moment (1949) as the victim of a blackmailer played by James Mason. Then, easily shifting images again, she changed her screen persona to that of an elegant, witty and nurturing wife and mother in two comedies directed by Vincente Minnelli.

Playing the role of Ellie Banks, the wife of Spencer Tracy and mother of Elizabeth Taylor, Bennett appeared in both Father of the Bride (1950) and Father's Little Dividend (1951).

She made a number of radio appearances from the 1930s to the 1950s, performing on such programs as The Edgar Bergen and Charlie McCarthy Show, Duffy's Tavern, The Jack Benny Program, Ford Theater, Suspense and the anthology series Lux Radio Theater and Screen Guild Theater.

With the increasing popularity of television, Bennett made five guest appearances in 1951, including an episode of Sid Caesar and Imogene Coca's Your Show of Shows.

Political views
She was a very active member of both the Hollywood Democratic Committee and The Hollywood Anti-Nazi League and donated her time and money to many liberal causes (such as the Civil Rights Movement) and political candidates (including Franklin D. Roosevelt, Henry A. Wallace, Adlai Stevenson II, John F. Kennedy, Robert F. Kennedy, and Jimmy Carter) during her lifetime.

Scandal
For 12 years Bennett was represented by agent Jennings Lang, the onetime vice-president of the Sam Jaffe Agency, who then headed MCA's West Coast television operations. She and Lang met on the afternoon of December 13, 1951, to talk over an upcoming TV show.

Bennett parked her Cadillac convertible in the lot at the back of the MCA offices, at Santa Monica Boulevard and Rexford Drive, across the street from the Beverly Hills Police Department, and she and Lang drove off in his car. Meanwhile, her husband Walter Wanger drove past about 2:30 p.m. and noticed his wife's car parked there. Half-an-hour later, he again saw her car there and stopped to wait. Bennett and Lang drove into the parking lot a few hours later and he walked her to her convertible. As she started the engine, turned on the headlights, and prepared to drive away, Lang leaned on the car, with both hands raised to his shoulders, and talked to her.

In a fit of jealousy, Wanger walked up and twice shot and wounded the unsuspecting agent. One bullet hit Jennings in the right thigh, near the hip, and the other penetrated his groin. Bennett said she did not see Wanger at first. She said she suddenly saw two vivid flashes, then Lang slumped to the ground. As soon as she recognized who had fired the shots, she told Wanger, "Get away and leave us alone." He tossed the pistol into his wife's car.

She and the parking lot's service station manager took Lang to the agent's doctor. He was then taken to a hospital, where he recovered. The police station was located across the lot, officers had heard the shots, and came to the scene and found the gun in Bennett's car when they took Wanger into custody. Wanger was booked and fingerprinted, and underwent lengthy questioning.

"I shot him because I thought he was breaking up my home," Wanger told the chief of police of Beverly Hills. He was booked on suspicion of assault with intent to commit murder. Bennett denied a romance. "But if Walter thinks the relationships between Mr. Lang and myself are romantic or anything but strictly business, he is wrong," she declared. She blamed the trouble on financial setbacks involving film productions Wanger was involved with, and said he was on the verge of a nervous breakdown. The following day Wanger, out on bond, returned to their Holmby Hills home, collected his belongings and moved out. Bennett, however, said there would not be a divorce.

On December 14, Bennett issued a statement in which she said she hoped her husband "will not be blamed too much" for wounding her agent. She read the prepared statement in the bedroom of her home to a group of newspapermen while TV cameras recorded the scene.

Wanger's attorney Jerry Giesler mounted a "temporary insanity" defense. He then decided to waive his right to a jury, and threw himself on the mercy of the court. Wanger served a four-month sentence in the County Honor Farm at Castaic, California, 39 miles north of Downtown Los Angeles, quickly returning to his career to make a series of successful films.

Meanwhile, Bennett went to Chicago to appear on the stage in the role as the young witch Gillian Holroyd in Bell, Book, and Candle, then went on national tour with the production.

She made only five movies in the decade that followed the 1951 shooting incident, and only two films in the 1970s, for the incident was a stain on her career and she became virtually blacklisted. Blaming the scandal that occurred for destroying her career in the motion picture industry, Bennett once said, "I might as well have pulled the trigger myself." Although Humphrey Bogart, a longtime friend, pleaded with Paramount Pictures on her behalf to keep her after her role as Amelie Ducotel in We're No Angels (1955), the studio refused.

As the movie offers dwindled after the scandal, Bennett continued touring in stage successes, such as Susan and God, Once More, with Feeling, The Pleasure of His Company and Never Too Late. Her next TV appearance was in the role of Bettina Blane in an episode of General Electric Theater in 1954. Other roles included Honora in Climax! (1955) and Vickie Maxwell in Playhouse 90 (1957). In 1958, she appeared as the mother in the short-lived television comedy/drama Too Young to Go Steady to teenagers played by Brigid Bazlen and Martin Huston.

She starred on Broadway in the comedy Love Me Little (1958), which ran for only eight performances.

Of the scandal, in a 1981 interview, Bennett contrasted the judgmental 1950s with the sensation-crazed 1970s and 1980s. "It would never happen that way today," she said, laughing. "If it happened today, I'd be a sensation. I'd be wanted by all studios for all pictures."

Later years
Despite the shooting scandal and the damage it caused Bennett's film career, she and Wanger remained married until 1965. She continued to work steadily on the stage and in television, including a guest role as Denise Mitchell in an episode of TV's Burke's Law (1965).

Bennett received star billing in the gothic soap opera Dark Shadows for its entire five-year run, 1966 to 1971, receiving an Emmy Award nomination in 1968 for her performance as Elizabeth Collins Stoddard, mistress of the haunted Collinwood Mansion. Her other roles in Dark Shadows were Naomi Collins, Judith Collins Trask, Elizabeth Collins Stoddard PT (parallel time, as the show described its alternate reality), Flora Collins, and Flora Collins PT. In 1970, she appeared as Elizabeth in House of Dark Shadows, the feature film adaptation of the series. However, she declined to appear in the sequel Night of Dark Shadows, and her character Elizabeth was mentioned therein as being recently deceased.

Her autobiography The Bennett Playbill, written with Lois Kibbee, was published in 1970.

Her other TV guest appearances include Bennett's roles as Joan Darlene Delaney in an episode of The Governor & J.J. (1970) and as Edith in an episode of Love, American Style (1971). She starred in five made-for-TV movies between 1972 and 1982.

Bennett also appeared in one more feature film, as Madame Blanc in director Dario Argento's horror film Suspiria (1977), for which she received a 1978 Saturn Award nomination for Best Supporting Actress.

Bennett and retired publisher/movie critic David Wilde were married on February 14, 1978, 13 days before her 68th birthday, in White Plains, New York. Their marriage lasted until her death in 1990.

Celebrated for not taking herself too seriously, Bennett said in a 1986 interview, "I don't think much of most of the films I made, but being a movie star was something I liked very much."

Bennett has a motion pictures star on the Hollywood Walk of Fame for her contributions to the film industry. Her star is located at 6300 Hollywood Boulevard, a short distance from the star of her sister Constance.

Death
Bennett died of heart failure on Friday evening, December 7, 1990, aged 80, at her home in Scarsdale, New York. She is interred in Pleasant View Cemetery, Lyme, Connecticut, with her parents.

Filmography
Bennett appeared in many movies and television productions, listed below in their entirety.

Film

Television

The Nash Airflyte Theater (1951) episode: Peggy
Your Show of Shows (1951) 1 episode
Danger (1951) episode: A Clear Case of Suicide
Somerset Maugham TV Theatre (1951) episode: Smith Serves
Somerset Maugham TV Theatre (1951) episode: The Dream
General Electric Theater (1954) episode: You Are Young Only Once, as Bettina Blane
The Best of Broadway (1954) episode: The Man Who Came to Dinner, as Lorraine Sheldon
Climax! (1955) episode: The Dark Fleece, as Honora
The Ford Television Theatre (1955) episode: Letters Marked Personal, as Marcia Manners
The Ford Television Theatre (1956) episode: Dear Diane, as Marion
Playhouse 90 (1957) episode: The Thundering Wave, as Vickie Maxwell
The DuPont Show of the Month (1957) episode: Junior Miss, as Grace Graves
Pursuit (1958) episode: Epitaph for a Golden Girl
Too Young to Go Steady (1959) (own series), as Mary Blake
Burke's Law (1965) episode: Who Killed Mr. Colby in Ladies' Lingerie?, as Denise Mitchell
Dark Shadows (1966–1971) (series regular, 386 episodes), as Elizabeth Collins Stoddard / Naomi Collins / Judith Collins / Flora Collins
The Governor & J.J. (1970) episode: Check the Check, as Joan Darlene Delaney
Love, American Style (1971) episode segment: Love and the Second Time, as Edith
Dr. Simon Locke (1972) episode: The Cortessa Rose, as Cortessa

Made-for-TV movies
Gidget Gets Married (1972) as Claire Ramsey
The Eyes of Charles Sand (1972) as Aunt Alexandra
Suddenly, Love (1978) as Mrs. Graham
This House Possessed (1981) as Rag Lady
Divorce Wars: A Love Story (1982) as Adele Burgess

As herself

Screen Actors (1950) (uncredited)
The Colgate Comedy Hour (1951) 1 episode
What's My Line? (1951) 1 episode
The Ken Murray Show  (1951) 1 episode
Ford Festival (1951)
I've Got A Secret (1953) 
Climax! (1956) episode: The Louella Parsons Story
To Tell the Truth (1958) 1 episode
The Mike Douglas Show (1964, 1967, 1970, 1970, 1977) 5 episodes
The Merv Griffin Show (1967) 1 episode
Personality (1968)  1 episode
The Hollywood Squares (1970) 1 episode
The Virginia Graham Show (1970) 1 episode
The Hollywood Greats (1977) 2 episodes: Humphrey Bogart; Spencer Tracy
The Guiding Light (1982) 1 episode
The Spencer Tracy Legacy: A Tribute by Katharine Hepburn (1986)

Short subject
Screen Snapshots (1932)
Hollywood on Parade No. A-12 (1933)
The Fashion Side of Hollywood (1935)
Hollywood Party (1937)
Screen Snapshots Series 19, No. 9: Sports in Hollywood (1940)
Hedda Hopper's Hollywood, No. 6 (1942)
Screen Actors (1950) (uncredited)

Radio appearances

Further reading

References

External links

 
 
 
 
 
 Photos of Joan Bennett in 'Trade Winds' 1938 by Ned Scott
 Joan Bennett Photo Gallery
 A collection of old time radio recordings featuring Joan Bennett

1910 births
1990 deaths
American people of English descent
American people of Jewish descent
American people of Spanish descent
American film actresses
American silent film actresses
American stage actresses
American television actresses
American radio personalities
20th-century American memoirists
American women memoirists
Actresses from New Jersey
People from Fort Lee, New Jersey
People from Scarsdale, New York
20th-century American actresses
20th Century Studios contract players
RKO Pictures contract players